Medipalle (or Medipalle, or Medipally) may refer to:
Medipally, a town in Medchal district, Telangana, India
Medipalle mandal, a mandal in Jagtial District, Telangana, India
Medipalle (village), a village in Medipalle mandal